Lourene Walker Barto (née Lourene Walker George; July 1, 1913 – July 23, 2004) is a former Republican member of the Pennsylvania House of Representatives.

References

Republican Party members of the Pennsylvania House of Representatives
Women state legislators in Pennsylvania
1913 births
2004 deaths
20th-century American politicians
20th-century American women politicians
21st-century American women